State Road 48 (SR 48) in the U.S. State of Indiana is an east–west state highway running through southern Indiana.  It has three distinct and separate sections.  The western terminus of SR 48 is at State Road 63 and the eastern terminus at U.S. Route 50.

Route description

Western section 
The western section begins at SR 63 and heads east towards Jasonville.  Passing through Shelburn at an intersection with U.S. Route 41 (US 41) and U.S. Route 150 (US 150).  East of Jasonville SR 48 heads east towards Worthington.  Northwest of Worthington SR 48 ends at State Road 157.

Middle section 
The middle section of SR 48 begins at an intersection with State Road 43 and SR 48 heads east towards Bloomington.  The eastern terminus of this section is at an interchange with Interstate 69, Indiana State Road 37 (SR 37) and State Road 45 (SR 45) in Bloomington.

Eastern section 
The eastern section begins at an intersection with State Road 229 and SR 48 heads east from that intersection.  SR 48 passes through intersection with State Road 129, State Road 101, and State Road 148 before entering Lawrenceburg.  In Lawrenceburg SR 48 has an intersection with US 50, this intersection is the eastern terminus of SR 48.

Major intersections

See also
 List of Indiana state highways

References

External links

048
Transportation in Clay County, Indiana
Transportation in Dearborn County, Indiana
Transportation in Greene County, Indiana
Transportation in Monroe County, Indiana
Transportation in Owen County, Indiana
Transportation in Ripley County, Indiana
Transportation in Sullivan County, Indiana